Bell Bottom may refer to:
 Bell-bottoms, a style of trousers
 Bell Bottom (2019 film),  an Indian Kannada-language crime comedy film
 Bell Bottom (2021 film), an Indian Hindi-language action thriller film